It's the Girls! is the fourteenth studio album by American singer Bette Midler. It was released by Warner Bros. Records on November 4, 2014. Midler's first release with the label since Bette (2000), the album is a collection representing the music of the great girl groups of the past.

The album sold 40,000 copies in its first week of release in the United States, thus allowing it to reach number three on the Billboard 200, her highest position on the chart. This made Midler only the second female singer after Barbra Streisand to have top 10 albums in five consecutive decades. It's the Girls! also marked Midler's highest debut week sales ever, and her second-highest position in the US after the Beaches soundtrack, released in 1988.

Critical reception

AllMusic editor Matt Collar found that the album "sounds like a retrospective, a return to the cabaret and theatrical style of her early career. Working with veteran producers Marc Shaiman and Scott Riesett, Midler frames her resonant vocal chops with lush arrangements that, while reverential to the original recordings, certainly allow her to express her own personality on each song [...] These are brightly produced songs perfectly suited to Midler's vocal style, stage bravado, and cheeky sense of humor." Amy Rose from Rolling Stone, wrote that "Midler has a voice that’s rich enough to reanimate any pop standard [...] and the album’s spirit of femme camaraderie comes through in their powerhouse harmonies and jokey just-us-girls delivery." Stephen Holden, writing for The New York Times, felt that It's the Girls! "was "one of her best [...] That music, along with Motown, is in Ms. Midler and [producer] Mr. Shaiman’s bones, and their fit is as comfortable as ever [...] Midler’s brash, mouthy vocal persona is still capable of sounding playfully transgressive, at least by ’60s standards."

Commercial performance
It's the Girls! debuted at number three on the US Billboard 200, selling 40,000 copies in its first week of release, ending November 9, 2014, according to Nielsen SoundScan. This made Midler only the second female singer after Barbra Streisand to have top 10 albums in five consecutive decades. The album also marked Midler's highest debut week sales ever, and her second-highest position in the US after the Beaches soundtrack, which came in at number two in 1988.

Track listing
All tracks prodced by Marc Shaiman and Scott M. Riesett.

Charts

Weekly charts

Year-end charts

Certifications

References

External links
 It's the Girls! at Bette Midler's website

2014 albums
Bette Midler albums
Warner Records albums
Covers albums
Traditional pop albums